Antaeotricha plesistia is a moth in the family Depressariidae. It was described by Edward Meyrick in 1930. It is found in Brazil.

The wingspan is 21–23 mm. The forewings are light greyish-ochreous with the extreme costal edge whitish and the stigmata blackish, the plical elongate, obliquely beyond the first discal. There is an oblique series of three small dark fuscous dots from beneath the costa before the middle to the second discal and a strongly excurved series of similar dots from beneath the costa at three-fifths to the tornus. A marginal series of blackish dots is found around the apical part of the costa and termen. The hindwings are light grey, towards the base whitish-tinged and with the costa broadly expanded on the basal three-fifths in males, also with a pale yellowish subcostal
groove to the middle.

References

Moths described in 1930
plesistia
Moths of South America